Socialist Workers Organization is the name of more than one political organization:

Socialist Workers Organization (New Zealand)
Socialist Workers Organisation (Senegal)

Political party disambiguation pages